Joseph Patrick Dwyer (September 28, 1976 – June 28, 2008) was an American soldier, who became famous for a photograph of him helping an ailing Iraqi boy. Dwyer had enlisted in the United States Army after 9/11 and went on to serve as a combat medic in the 3rd Infantry Division.

Dwyer died on June 28, 2008. On June 28, Mr Dwyer, 31, called a taxi to take him to a hospital near his home in Pinehurst, North Carolina, after earlier taking prescription pills and inhaling fumes from a computer cleaner aerosol. When the driver arrived, Mr Dwyer said he was too weak to open the door. Police had to kick it down and found he had collapsed. Within minutes, he had died. He was said to have been suffering from post-traumatic stress disorder.

References

External links
 "Soldier returns from Iraq to share story with ROTC students" - Richmond County Daily Journal
 "Former War Photographer Remembers Soldier" - CBS News
 "From war hero to war haunted, LI vet depicted in famous struggle with menacing stress disorder that escalated to a standoff" - News Day
 "What Happens When Soldiers Come Home From War?" - Eyewitness News

1976 births
2008 deaths
People from Manhasset, New York
United States Army personnel of the Iraq War
War photographs
Combat medics
United States Army soldiers
Photographs of children in war
People with post-traumatic stress disorder
Drug-related deaths in North Carolina